Thomas Cleghorn (born June 1871) was a Scottish footballer who played as a half back. He made 101 appearances in the Football League for Blackburn Rovers and Liverpool, in which he scored three goals. Having begun his career with Scottish Football League club Leith Athletic, he also went on to play in the Southern and Western Leagues for Portsmouth and Plymouth Argyle.

Born in the Scottish burgh of Leith, Cleghorn began his playing career with his local club, Leith Athletic. As a half back he played primarily on the left side of the pitch. He joined Blackburn Rovers in 1894 and made 45 appearances in the Football League over the next two seasons, in which he scored three goals. A club historian described Cleghorn as "a great little player who never knew when he was beaten. He worked like a demon, tackled effectively and headed the ball with wonderful skill." He moved to Liverpool in 1896 and became a first-team regular over the next four seasons. Cleghorn left Liverpool in 1899 having made 56 league appearances and 14 more in cup competitions, scoring once.

Cleghorn's next club was Portsmouth, where he won the Southern and Western League titles in 1901. Portsmouth's manager at the time was Frank Brettell and in 1903, when Brettell became the manager of Plymouth Argyle, he recommended Cleghorn for the position of team trainer to the club's board of directors. Cleghorn continued to play for the next three seasons as a reserve half-back, in addition to his coaching duties, and made five league appearances. He was a "clever and conscientious" coach who was "well-esteemed by all."

References

1871 births
People from Leith
Scottish footballers
Leith Athletic F.C. players
Blackburn Rovers F.C. players
Liverpool F.C. players
Portsmouth F.C. players
Plymouth Argyle F.C. players
Scottish Football League players
English Football League players
Southern Football League players
Western Football League players
Plymouth Argyle F.C. non-playing staff
Year of death missing
Association footballers not categorized by position
Footballers from Edinburgh